Peltola may refer to:

Peltola (surname)
Peltola, Turku